is a Japanese manga series written and illustrated by Noi Asano. It has been adapted into an anime television series. Directed by Asano himself, it consisted of thirty 30-second episodes that were compiled into a DVD released on April 25, 2014. The animated series was a jury selection during the 17th Japan Media Arts Festival Awards.

Characters
Chiisana Ojisan

"Watashi"

References

External links
Official manga website 
Official anime website 

2008 manga
2012 anime television series debuts
Anime series based on manga
Ohzora Publishing manga